The Vietnam national football team represents Vietnam in men's international football and is controlled by the Vietnam Football Federation, the governing body of football in Vietnam.

Vietnam was introduced to football by the French in the 19th century. However, due to various conflicts that occurred in the country throughout the 20th century, the development of Vietnamese football was significantly hampered. When Vietnam was split into Democratic Republic of Vietnam (North) and Republic of Vietnam (South) in 1954, two national teams existed simultaneously and were controlled by separate governing bodies. After the country was unified in 1976, the separate governing bodies were combined and renamed to the Vietnam Football Federation.

Since the 1990s, Vietnam has re-integrated into global football, and the sport soon became an integral part of Vietnamese society and a soft-power mechanism against the country's negative reputation due to the Vietnam War and subsequent international conflicts. This has made the national football team a part of Vietnamese nationalism, enjoying nationwide and overseas support. Vietnamese supporters are dubbed to be passionate and renowned for large celebrations over the team's achievements on both senior and youth levels.

History

Early history (1896–1954)

The introduction of football into Vietnam traced its roots in 1896, during the era of colonial French Cochinchina. At the early stage, the sport were only played among French civil servants, merchants, and soldiers. The French then encouraged local Vietnamese to play football and other sports that were introduced to them in order to divert their interest from politics, resulting in football being spread to the northern and central region. On 20 July 1908, the newspaper Southern Luc Tan Van reported the match between two local Vietnamese teams for the first time. A football guidebook published in 1925 by Vietnamese doctor Pham Van Tiec attracted the interest among Vietnamese youngsters. By 1928, the Vietnamese had established the Annamite Sports Bureau and in the same year they sent a football team to compete in Singapore. More local football clubs then established in both northern and southern Vietnam. However, it was not until after the World War II that football clubs in the region started to become more organized. Vietnam played their first ever international match in a 2-4 loss against Korea in Saigon.

Two Vietnam national teams (1954–1976)

Two national football teams existed when Vietnam was divided into South Vietnam and North Vietnam. The southern team participated in the first two AFC Asian Cup finals (1956 AFC Asian Cup and 1960 AFC Asian Cup) and earned two fourth-place finishes. They won the first Southeast Asian Games gold in 1959 in Thailand. The team also participated in the qualification for the 1974 FIFA World Cup, beating Thailand 1–0 to qualify the classification matches. They ultimately lost their group opening matches by 0–4 to Japan and 0–1 to Hong Kong. The team played their last game in a 0-3 loss against Malaysia in 1975. Meanwhile, the northern team was less active. They were not a member of either AFC or FIFA, but they often played against other communist states between 1956 and 1966. Their first game was a 3-5 loss against China PR under head coach Truong Tan Buu. They participated in the first GANEFO (Games of the New Emerging Forces) competitions at Indonesia in 1962 and Cambodia in 1966. Both teams ceased to exist when the North and South regions reunited into the Socialist Republic of Vietnam following the end of the Vietnam War. However, North Vietnam did not become a member of AFC and FIFA until 1976. Because both of them were members of FIFA (South from 1954 and North from 1964), the later unified Vietnam team is classified as the successor of them both by FIFA.

The development of football during this era for both Vietnams was marked with stagnation as the Vietnam War occurred at the same time. Because of the war, Vietnam, by then, a major football force in Asia, started losing its reputation. Thus, the conflict had greatly reduced Vietnamese footballing ability and weakened the country seriously. However, the following Cambodian–Vietnamese War and Sino-Vietnamese War, and global sanctions against the country, had depleted the nation's football team and turned Vietnam into one of the weakest teams in the world and Asia overall. For this reason, Vietnamese football can be still considered new and unknown for the rest of the world, in spite of its long standing history as Vietnam only rejoined global football in 1991.

Vietnam's professional football league, known as the All Vietnam Football Championship, was launched in 1980 to redevelop Vietnamese football after a long period of civil war. In 1989, following the Đổi Mới reforms, a new football federation was formed. Vietnamese sports began to return to international events. After three months of preparation, in August 1989, the First Congress of the new football federation took place in Hanoi, declaring the formation of the Vietnam Football Federation. Trịnh Ngọc Chữ, deputy minister of General Department of Sports, was elected as the first president of VFF.

Post Vietnam War and redevelopment era (1991–2006)
The reunified Vietnam national football team rejoined international football by participating in the 1991 edition of the Southeast Asian Games in the Philippines. They have participated in every edition of the tournament since then. Unified Vietnam has also regularly entered qualification for the FIFA World Cup since the 1994 edition and for the AFC Asian Cup since the 1996 edition.

Vietnam participated in FIFA World Cup qualification in 1994 World Cup campaign for the first time as an unified nation, having participated in the 1974 qualification as South Vietnam. The national side at the time was not successful in World Cup campaigns, failing in both the 1994 and 1998 qualifications with only one win.

In 1996, Vietnam participated in the first (1996) ASEAN Football Federation championship (then known as Tiger Cup) and finished third. Vietnam hosted the second Tiger Cup in 1998, where they heartbreakingly lost 0–1 to Singapore in the final. From 2000 to 2007, Vietnam continued their quest to win the Southeast Asian trophy, but they often ended short. In 1996, Vietnam gained international headline for inviting Italian giant Juventus F.C., the reigning 1995–96 UEFA Champions League champion, to play in a friendly match in Hanoi. Despite a 1-2 loss, the match was a watershed moment that boosted the development of football in the country. Vietnam has participated in all editions of the ASEAN championship ever since.

Vietnam was the host of the 1999 Dunhill Cup, a friendly tournament for both senior and U-23 players. Since it was categorized as a mingled senior and U-23 competition, some national teams had decided to participate using its senior reserve side. In this competition, Vietnam created a promising performance, including a shock win over then-1994 FIFA World Cup and UEFA Euro 1996 participant Russia 1–0 and drawing with 1998 FIFA World Cup participant Iran 2–2 and topping the group. Vietnam was then eliminated in the semi-finals after a 1–4 defeat to China.

2002 FIFA World Cup qualification had some of Vietnam's few bright moments during these World Cup campaigns, with the team winning three matches and drawing one, both played in Dammam. However, with the team having lost against Saudi Arabia, Vietnam did not qualify for the World Cup. The 2004 AFC Asian Cup qualification was also unsuccessful, with Vietnam falling to South Korea and Oman, but managing to create a shock 1–0 win to 2002 FIFA World Cup's fourth-place winner South Korea in Muscat, which remains as one of Vietnam's greatest football feats since unification. The 2006 FIFA World Cup qualification had been extremely depressing for Vietnam, with the team once again failing, falling behind South Korea and Lebanon, and only staying above Maldives by goal difference.

Renaissance of Vietnam football (2007–2009)

Vietnam hosted the 2007 AFC Asian Cup along with Indonesia, Malaysia and Thailand, despite failing to qualify for the Asian Cup since the 1990s. The team was ranked second lowest only after Malaysia, but Vietnam created shock by defeating the UAE 2–0, drawing 1–1 with another Gulf team, Qatar, before losing 1–4 to defending champions Japan. Vietnam were the only Southeast Asian and host team to reach the quarter-finals, where they lost to eventual champions Iraq 0–2. This marked the beginning of the first Vietnamese football renaissance.

Vietnam won their first AFF Championship title in 2008, in which they were held in Group B with Thailand, Malaysia and Laos. After losing to Thailand 0–2 in the opener, Vietnam defeated Malaysia 3–2 and Laos 4–0. In the semi-finals, Vietnam held the defending champion Singapore to 0–0 at home before winning 1–0 away, making the final for the first time in 10 years. Vietnam met Thailand again in the finals. They defeated Thailand 2-1 in the first leg in Thailand. Returning home, Vietnam drew 1-1 behind Le Cong Vinh's last-minute header, resulting in an aggregate 3-2 victory. This would be the team's first international title since rejoining global football.

Vietnam almost managed a successful 2011 AFC Asian Cup qualification when Vietnam performed well against Syria and Lebanon, as well as against the neighbor China; but the shortcoming on scoring goals once again proved to be instrumental on denying Vietnam's qualification to 2011 AFC Asian Cup, as the team finished third with only a single 3–1 home win over Lebanon and two draws away to both Levant opponents Syria and Lebanon. Despite losing all two matches against China, including the huge loss 1–6 in Hangzhou, Vietnam still scored at least one single goal in both games.

Decline (2009–2014)
The period between 2009 and 2014 witnessed the decline of Vietnamese football. The team participated in 2010, 2014 World Cup qualifiers and 2015 Asian Cup qualifiers, but were unsuccessful and accepted the early eliminations. The team loss 0–6 on aggregate against the United Arab Emirates in the first round of 2010 World Cup qualification. In the 2014 World Cup qualifiers, Vietnam could only defeated Macau in the first round, before being eliminated by Qatar in the second round. The worst of this decline was in 2015 Asian Cup qualifiers where Vietnam lost five out of six games and finished at the bottom of the group including the United Arab Emirates, Uzbekistan and Hong Kong.

Along with the poor performance in the continental qualification, Vietnam suffered a setback in the regional tournament. The team had lost to Malaysia, the eventual champion, in the 2010 AFF Championship semi-final. The 2012 AFF Championship even brought a worse disaster for Vietnam when the team was eliminated in the group stage and only obtained a 1–1 draw against Myanmar, while losing 1–3 to Thailand and 0–1 to Philippines.

Rebuilding (2014–2017)
The national team of Vietnam started to witness significant changes under the tenure of Toshiya Miura, who took charge of Vietnam from 2014 to 2016. The Japanese coach was accredited for rebuilding the national team of Vietnam after the failed 2015 AFC Asian Cup qualification, and had a significant impact on the improvement of the team's performances. One of the most renowned achievement under Miura's era was with the youth team, when the Olympic side managed to cruise pass Olympic Iran, a major Asian force, at the 2014 Asian Games with an unthinkable 4–1 victory. Many of the young players nurtured by coach Miura would be brought to senior side, where the team managed a fine performance in 2014 AFF Championship, but Vietnam failed to progress beyond the semi-finals after a shocking 2–4 defeat to Malaysia right at home, in spite of winning 2–1 away before. Vietnamese police had sought to investigate this match, but found no evidence of rigged bribery or corruption as also stated in the findings of Swiss-based international supplier betting services Sportradar.

Miura led Vietnam in the 2018 World Cup qualifiers when Vietnam was grouped together with Thailand, Indonesia, Chinese Taipei and Iraq; Indonesia later was banned to participate by FIFA. Vietnam managed a fine performance, drawing Iraq 1–1 at home. However, two disappointing defeats to Thailand away 0–1 and humiliating 0–3 home loss to the same opponent had put the team under heavy criticism. Toshiya Miura, despite improvement, was sacked by the VFF after the Olympic side's failure to qualify for 2016 Rio Olympics.

Hope was put into new coach, Nguyễn Hữu Thắng, some of the first fine Vietnamese managers during the era. Under Nguyễn Hữu Thắng, Vietnam once again progressed to the semi-finals of 2016 AFF Championship, but lost to Indonesia in another thrilling semi-finals, being held 2–2 at home and previously lost 1–2 away to the same rival. The team's disappointment was somehow relieved a little, as the Golden Star Warriors participated in 2019 AFC Asian Cup qualification for finishing third in their World Cup qualification group. The Vietnamese side managed two draws in their opening run against Afghanistan in Tajikistan and a goalless draw to Jordan in Ho Chi Minh City. However, the Olympic side was shockingly eliminated in the group stage of 2017 SEA Games, coach Nguyễn Hữu Thắng was relieved from duty, and the team faced a tremendous crisis of confidence as fans have lost their will to support the team. Interim coach Mai Đức Chung was appointed to help Vietnam in two crucial Asian Cup qualification match against neighbour Cambodia, in which coach Mai Đức Chung was able to revive some of the team's lost spirit, beating Cambodia 2–1 away and a thrashing 5–0 win at home. These wins allowed Vietnam to join top two for final tickets.

The Golden Generation with Park Hang-seo (2017–2023)
Park Hang-seo, former assistant of Guus Hiddink during the 2002 FIFA World Cup, was appointed as the new coach of the Vietnam national team on 29 September 2017, after an attempt to negotiate with Takashi Sekizuka was unsuccessful; previously the VFF also tried to contact American manager Steve Sampson, but received no response. Upon his arrival in Vietnam, Park was greeted with skepticism and jeers from the Vietnamese.

Park's first match as coach of Vietnam was in the same 2019 Asian Cup qualification, where Vietnam beats Cambodia at home in a 5–0 win on 10 October 2017, followed by a 0–0 draw at home against Afghanistan on 14 November 2017, thus allowed Vietnam to qualify for the 2019 AFC Asian Cup, their first ever Asian Cup since 2007. Park himself, though, was criticized due to the team's unconvincing performance. However, the mood rapidly changed after Vietnam youth team's unbelievable achievements in the 2018 AFC U-23 Championship and 2018 Asian Games where Park Hang-seo was also the coach of the U-23 and Olympic team. With the same U-23 players, he formed the squad of Vietnamese senior team in a meaningless 1–1 draw to Jordan in 2019 Asian Cup qualification, which both teams qualified together.

2018 AFF Championship

Also with these young players, the 2018 AFF Championship became Vietnam's second AFF Championship title. In Group A, Vietnam managed three victories against Laos, Malaysia, Cambodia and a draw with Myanmar. In the semi-finals, they defeated the Philippines twice, and in the finals defeated Malaysia 3–2 aggregated, drawing 2–2 away and winning 1–0 home.

2019 AFC Asian Cup

It wasn't until the 2019 AFC Asian Cup that Vietnam truly began to gain international recognition. With the entire squad made up with the successful U-23 players, Vietnam had the youngest squad in the tournament. Being drawn into group D along with Iran, Iraq and Yemen, Vietnam lost to Iraq 2-3 and Iran 0-2 before beating Yemen in their final group matches to become the last best third-place team qualifying for the round of sixteen. Then, they surprised everyone by defeating favoured Jordan which had previously defeated the defending champions Australia and earlier played a friendly match against 2018 FIFA World Cup runners-up Croatia, winning 4–2 in penalty shoot-out. The win sent million of Vietnamese into the street for celebrations. In the quarter-finals, Vietnam played against Japan but failed to continue the success after their opponent was awarded a penalty kick which was decided through the video assistant referee (VAR), resulting in a 0–1 score by Ritsu Dōan until the final whistle was blown.

2022 FIFA World Cup qualification

Vietnam was grouped in the Qualifying Second Round Group G with three other Southeast Asian rivals: Thailand, Malaysia and Indonesia, along with the United Arab Emirates. The Vietnamese started with a 0–0 away draw over Thailand before defeating Malaysia 1–0 at home and then achieved a 3–1 away win against Indonesia. In November 2019, Vietnam faced the United Arab Emirates on home soil with attempts to break a 12-year winless streak to the opponent. In spite of facing struggle in the early minutes, a red card to the UAE gave the Vietnamese an advantage. They eventually managed to beat the Emirates 1–0. Then, Vietnam moved to a thrilling encounter against neighbour and fellow powerhouse Thailand at home, where both teams played in another goalless draw, in a match with a crucial Akinfeev-penalty like save by Đặng Văn Lâm and two disallowed Vietnamese goals, to foster Vietnam's top position in the Joint World Cup/Asian Cup qualifying Group G.

However, due to the COVID-19 pandemic, Vietnam was forced to play all their remaining qualifying second-round games in the United Arab Emirates. In this campaign, Vietnam suffered a great loss of key players, as the midfield soul Đỗ Hùng Dũng suffered from a severe injury in 2021 V.League 1 that caused him 6-months of recession, while best goalie Đặng Văn Lâm, due to an unexpected incident related to COVID-19 in his Japanese club Cerezo Osaka, could not come to the national team in Dubai, the key midfielder Nguyễn Tuấn Anh, after suffering an aggressive tackle from an Indonesian player in the 20th minute of the first match, had to miss the rest of the qualifying second round. Nevertheless, even with such great loss, Vietnam's campaign in UAE was an astonishing success. Vietnam pounded Indonesia 4–0 and held on to a 2–1 win against Malaysia. On the last match day, Vietnam battled it out in a thrilling encounter against hosts, UAE. After trailing 3–0, a late surge in the final 10 minutes brought 2 goals on the scoresheet for Vietnam, but it wasn't enough as the match ended 3–2 in favour of UAE. Despite losing however, with Australia defeated Jordan 1–0 in the decisive game of group B and later Saudi Arabia beating Uzbekistan 3–0 in the decisive game of group D, Vietnam officially claimed its ticket into the third and final round of the World Cup qualifiers for the first time ever, and automatic qualification to the 2023 AFC Asian Cup in China, after entering as one of the five best runner-ups, the second Southeast Asian nation after Thailand to achieve the feat.

In the third round, Vietnam was drawn into group B along with Japan, Australia, Saudi Arabia, China, and Oman to whom Vietnam entirely lost in the head-to-head record. The team played its best in every match, but due to suffering even greater loss of key players, Vietnam was unable to achieve a single point after the first seven games, losing seven straight games, and was officially eliminated from World Cup after a heavy 0–4 away loss against Australia in Melbourne Rectangular Stadium on 27 January 2022. However, just five days later, it became the first ever team from Southeast Asia to win a match in the final round of the World Cup qualifiers by beating China 3–1 at home on 1 February 2022, which coincided with the Lunar New Year's Day in Vietnam and China. The win was also the first-ever win from a Southeast Asian team against China in an official competitive match in 65 years, when Indonesia beat China 2–0 in the 1958 FIFA World Cup qualification. The team achieved another historical result in the last qualifying match with a 1–1 draw against host Japan in Saitama Stadium 2002 on 29 March marking the first time ever that Vietnam did not lose against Japan since its reintegration to international football. Nonetheless, Vietnam only earned 4 points in total after 10 matches of the third round (1 win, 1 draw, 8 losses) and finished bottom, losing against all teams in this round but ended up with a historic 3–1 win over China and a draw against Japan in the final match.

2022 AFF Championship
In October 2022, Park Hang-seo announced that he would leave his position as coach at the conclusion of the 2022 AFF Championship. In the tournament, Vietnam topped their group with victories against Laos, Malaysia and Myanmar and a draw against Singapore. Vietnam beat Indonesia in the semi final but lost 3-2 to Thailand in the final. Philippe Troussier is set to become the new coach of the senior team and the Under 23 team on 1 March 2023 until 31 July 2026.

Philippe Troussier era (2023–present)
On 16 February 2023, VFF surprisingly announced that Frenchman Philippe Troussier, who led South Africa and Japan to the 1998 and 2002 FIFA World Cups, had been appointed coach of Vietnam. Troussier was officially presented on 27 February 2023, making him the first World Cup profile manager to lead the country.

Team image

Kits
Vietnam's current kit sponsor is Grand Sport. The contract started in January 2015 which will end by the end of December 2019 but extended until 2023. Vietnam was also previously sponsored by Adidas, Li-Ning and Nike. The traditional home colour for the Vietnamese team is all red with yellow trim and the away colour is all white with red trim ever since they started the contract with Nike. With Adidas, it was just red and white. Occasionally, the team wore blue and yellow jerseys.

Kit suppliers

Sponsorship
Primary sponsors include: Honda, Yanmar, Grand Sport, Sony, Bia Saigon, Acecook, Coca-Cola, Vinamilk, Kao Vietnam, Herbalife Nutrition and TNI Corporation.

Logo

Unlike many national teams in the world, Vietnam is one of the few football teams to not feature their federation (VFF) logo, or logo that is styled from national emblem/coat of arms such as Russia, Australia or Poland at their jersey, but rather the national flag. The few other FIFA members to feature national flag includes Palestine, North Korea, Switzerland, Turkey, and currently is the only team to not feature the logo in Southeast Asia. The logo of VFF is used on team's gears (hats, bags, masks, coats, captain's armband in friendly matches,...) and in products of multimedia for team. However, in 1998 AFF Championship, team Vietnam used the former VFF logo at their jersey officially.

Despite VFF unveiling a logo of dragon for the national football team in 2017 (similar to the logo of elephant for Thailand), it was not incorporated onto the national jersey due to a negative reception from media and supporters. Furthermore, the dragon logo was intended only for the men's national team at first, which would be unreasonable if it was also incorporated onto the national jerseys and the uniforms of other teams (women's teams, youth teams, futsal teams, beach soccer teams). Finally it was removed.

Nicknames
The VFF's media outlets officially use the nickname  for the national team, which is derived from the star of the national flag on the team's jersey. The local media in Vietnam also refer the national team as simply "" (The selection).

Supporters

There are two major supporters' clubs for the national team, namely Vietnam Football Supporters (VFS) which was founded in 2014 and Vietnam Golden Stars (VGS) which was founded in 2017.

When the national team win important matches, the streets are often overwhelmed by large Vietnamese crowds in an activity known as street storming, which feature nationalist chants and the singing  of nationalist songs. Vietnamese passionate supporters have been witnessed during 2007 AFC Asian Cup when the team defeated the UAE 2–0 and later, the lone Southeast Asian side to sneak into the quarter-finals. During the 2019 AFC Asian Cup, Vietnamese fans were euphoric in celebration after beating Jordan in the round of 16.

Even in smaller tournaments, Vietnamese fans are also noted for large celebrations, such as when Vietnam won the 2008, 2018 AFF Championships, and 2018 AFC U-23 Championship in which their team finished runners-up after losing the final against Uzbekistan.

Stadiums

The Vietnamese national team mainly plays at Mỹ Đình National Stadium, although other venues are also used. Other venues used by the team are Hàng Đẫy Stadium, Thống Nhất Stadium, Cần Thơ Stadium.

Rivalries

Thailand

Thailand is often considered Vietnam's traditional and biggest rival. The matches between these two teams are always likened to the "El Clasico" of Southeast Asian football and are followed with much interest in both countries. Vietnam as South Vietnam first faced Thailand in 1956, then two teams also faced each other at the 1959 Southeast Asian Games and Vietnam won the two matches, in the group stage and the final (Thailand was host). Despite currently having the better overall record compared with Thailand with 23 wins, 12 draws, and 20 losses after 55 matches, Vietnam has generally poor results against Thailand since its reintegration into international football in 1991. After the match between two teams in the 2022 AFF Championship Final on 16 January 2023, Vietnam has faced Thailand in 26 matches at the national team level since 1991, winning only 3, drawing 8, and losing 19. Despite this, Vietnam, since reintegration to world's football, is renowned for its performance that punching above the weight, often due to its ability to culminate surprise results despite disadvantages, while Thailand has struggled harder to do the same.

Vietnam's most memorable win against Thailand was in the final of the 2008 AFF Championship, when a 2–1 win in the first leg in Bangkok set them up for their first-ever title, which they secured after a 1–1 draw in Hanoi.

Indonesia
Vietnam and neighbors Indonesia have faced each other in 38 matches, with Vietnam having the poorer record with 12 wins, 11 draws, and 16 losses. During the 20-year period from 1999 to 2019, Vietnam only drew and lost against Indonesia in official tournaments beginning after the 1–0 win over Indonesia in 1999 in the semi-finals of the 1999 SEA Games, lasting 12 matches, with seven draws and five losses. Finally, it ended on on 15 October 2019 when Vietnam won 3–1 against Indonesia in their third match of the 2022 FIFA World Cup qualification's second round in Bali.

Singapore
While Singapore was still a force in the AFF until 2012, this team was also a big rival of Vietnam. They have faced each other in 39 matches, with Vietnam dominating with 21 wins, 13 draws, and five losses. Since just reintegrating with international football in 1991, Vietnam experienced, in the period from 1993 to 1998, poorer head-to-head record against Singapore; especially when they lost the 1998 AFF Championship final. However, since 1998, Vietnam has been maintaining a series of unbeaten matches against Singapore to this day. It is worth noting that Vietnam's winning matches in this period against Singapore have never exceeded 1 goal, and there were 6 out of the 12 matches that had drawn results, although Vietnam still won in the remaining 6 matches.

Malaysia
As South Vietnam, the Vietnamese side had a poorer performance, with only three wins, three draws and seven losses, during that time the Malaysians posed as a formidable side in Asia. Since reintegration, however, Vietnam has overwhelmed in the head-to-head record against Malaysia with 14 wins, three draws and only six losses since 1991. Vietnam has also been maintaining the series of unbeaten match against Malaysia since 2014.

Results and fixtures

The following is a list of match results in the last 12 months, as well as any future matches that have been scheduled.

2022

2023

Coaching staff

Players

Current squad
The following 22 players were called up for a centralized training camp in Hanoi in March 2023. 

Caps and goals as of 16 January 2023 after the match against Thailand.

Recent call-ups
The following players have been called up for the team within the last 12 months and are still available for selection.

 PRE

 

 PRE
 PRE

 PRE

 PRE
 PRE

 PRE Preliminary squad
 INJ Player withdrew from the squad due to an injury.
 WD Player withdrew from the squad due to other reason.
 RET Retired from the national team.
 SUS Serving suspension.

Player records

Players in bold are still active with Vietnam.

Most appearances

Top goalscorers

Youngest players

Centuriate goals

Competitive record

FIFA World Cup

AFC Asian Cup

AFC Asian Games
Since 2002, the Asian Games Football tournament uses the Olympic team. See: Vietnam national Olympic football team

AFF Championship

AFF Southeast Asian Games
Since 2001, the SEA Games football competition has only allowed the olympic side to participate. See: Vietnam national Olympic football team

VFF Vietnam International Friendly Cup

All-time head-to-head record

1 includes the results of 
2 includes the results of 

FIFA world rankings
FIFA-ranking

Honours
The titles listed below are for the Vietnam men's national football team alone, with no age limit; excluding the achievements of the youth football teams of Vietnam

Continental
AFC Asian Cup
Fourth place (2): 1956, 1960
Quarter-finals (2): 2007, 2019 
Regional
AFF Championship
 Champions (2): 2008, 2018
 Runners-up (2): 1998, 2022
 Third place (2): 1996, 2002
Southeast Asian Games
 Gold medal (1): 1959
 Silver medal (2): 1995, 1999
 Bronze medal (1): 1997
Friendly tournaments
VFF Vietnam International Friendly Cup
 Champions (1): 2022
 Runners-up (3): 2004, 2006, 2009
 Third place (1): 2012
King's Cup
 Runners-up (2): 2006, 2019
AYA Bank Cup
  Champions (1): 2016
LG Cup
 Runners-up (1): 2002

See also

Vietnam women's national football team
Vietnam Football Federation
Vietnam national under-23 football team
Vietnam national under-22 football team
Vietnam national under-21 football team
Vietnam national under-20 football team
Vietnam national under-17 football team

Notes

References

External links

Vietnam Football Federation official website
Vietnam's FIFA profile from FIFA website 

 
Asian national association football teams